Central Guadalcanal is a single-member constituency of the National Parliament of Solomon Islands. Established in 1973 when the Governing Council was expanded from 17 to 24 seats, it is located on the island of Guadalcanal.

List of MPs

Election results

2014

2010

2009

2006

2001

1997

1993

1989

1984

1980

1976

1973

References

Solomon Islands parliamentary constituencies
Governing Council of the Solomon Islands constituencies
Legislative Assembly of the Solomon Islands constituencies
1973 establishments in the Solomon Islands
Constituencies established in 1973